Rosaleen Mills (16 July 1905 – 17 September 1993) was an Irish activist and educator.

Early life and education
Rosaleen Mills was born in Ballinasloe, County Galway on 16 July 1905. She was the fourth of the five children of John and Rosetta Mills (née Dobbin). Her father was Resident Medical Superintendent of the Connaught District Lunatic Asylum. She was educated at Mount Pleasant school, Ballinasloe and the Roedean School in Brighton, England. She studied Spanish and French at Trinity College Dublin (TCD), attaining an MA in modern languages. While attending TCD she was an active member of the all-female Elizabethan Society, the only society women could join as members at the time. After graduation, she lived in Germany for a year, and travelled to France and Spain. Later, she was the first woman to address the College Historical Society in 1969 in which she proposed the motion "That This House Reveres the Memory of Miss Pankhurst" at a debate chaired by Sheelagh Murnaghan. The society subsequently named an annual competition in her honour, the "Rosaleen Mills Maidens Final".

Career
From 1930 to 1936 Mills taught at Mount Temple school in Clontarf, Dublin. From 1936 to 1937 she nursed her mother full-time, after which she took a position at the commercial office of the Canadian Embassy from 1938 to 1945. She then went on to teach at the private Knockrabo school in Goatstown, Dublin until its closure in the late 1950s. She helped to establish a new co-educational and non-denominational school Sutton Park in Sutton, Dublin, in 1957, serving as the vice-principle until she retired in 1970.

Activism
From the 1920s, Mills was active in a variety of women's organisations, beginning with those founded by suffragists in her youth, becoming acquainted with Hanna Sheehy-Skeffington and Rosamond Jacob. She was involved in campaigns for women to be permitted to join the police force, and against the 1927 Juries Act which prohibited female jurors. She was a member of the Women's Social and Progressive League.

Mills joined the Irish Housewives Association (IHA) soon after its establishment in 1942. She took part in the IHA campaigns and was a regular contributor to The Irish Housewife, the organisation's journal. From its establishment in 1948, she sat on the council of the Irish Association of Civil Liberty, serving as president in the early 1960s. She was also involved with the Dublin University Women Graduates Association, spending a summer in Geneva in 1951 representing Irish women graduates as a delegate of the International Federation of University Women, observing at the Economic and Social Council of the United Nations. Mills was elected president of the Irish Federation of Women's Graduates' Associations in 1963.

In 1965 the UN Commission on Women issued a directive to women's organisations internationally calling on them to examine the status of women in their country. This was led in Ireland by an "ad hoc committee", chaired by Hilda Tweedy with Mills sitting on the committee as an independent member. The committee outlined a number of discoveries, including that Ireland had not signed or ratified a number of UN conventions relating to women, as well as a number of issues relating to inequality in pay and access to education, and discrimination against married women. Following the findings of the committee, the Irish government established the first National Commission on the Status of Women in 1970, which presented wide-ranging recommendations for government policy changes in 1972. The Council for the Status of Women was established to ensure the implementation of the recommendations, with Tweedy elected chair, and Mills as vice chair. She replaced Tweedy as chair in May 1976, serving until April 1977. As the precursor to the National Women's Council of Ireland, the council was the largest women's organisation in Ireland.

Later life
Mills was fluent in seven languages, and travelled extensively across Europe and Russia. She was also involved in the Irish Georgian Society, the Irish Association for Social, Cultural and Economic Relations, An Taisce and the United Arts Club. For most of her adult life, she lived at 37 Percy Place, Dublin 4, before moving to St Mary's Nursing Home, Pembroke Road. She died there on 17 September 1993.

References

1905 births
1993 deaths
People from County Galway
Irish women's rights activists
Irish women activists